Leopold B. Felsen (born in Munich in 1924; died in the US September 24, 2005) was a physicist known for studies of Electromagnetism and wave-based disciplines. He had to flee Germany at 16 due to the Nazis. He has fundamental contributions to electromagnetic field analysis.

Academic life 
Leopold B. Felsen was a professor at Polytechnic University of New York and at Boston University College of Engineering, an IEEE life fellow and a fellow of both the Acoustical Society of America and the Optical Society of America. He earned bachelor's, master's and doctoral degrees from what was then the Polytechnic Institute of Brooklyn.

Awards 
In 1991 he won the IEEE Heinrich Hertz Medal.

Publications 
Leopold B. Felsen, and Nathan Marcuvitz, Radiation and scattering of waves, (1994), 888 pages.

References

1924 births
2005 deaths
German emigrants to the United States
20th-century American engineers
Fellow Members of the IEEE
Members of the United States National Academy of Engineering
Polytechnic Institute of New York University alumni
Polytechnic Institute of New York University faculty
Fellows of the Acoustical Society of America
Microwave engineers